Miodrag Todosijević (14 September 1941 – 11 November 1982) was a Serbian high jumper who competed in the 1968 Summer Olympics.

References

External links
 
 

1941 births
1982 deaths
Yugoslav male high jumpers
Olympic athletes of Yugoslavia
Athletes (track and field) at the 1968 Summer Olympics
Sportspeople from Kraljevo
Serbian male high jumpers
Mediterranean Games gold medalists for Yugoslavia
Athletes (track and field) at the 1967 Mediterranean Games
Universiade medalists in athletics (track and field)
Mediterranean Games medalists in athletics
Universiade gold medalists for Yugoslavia